Oak Park is a Metra commuter railroad station in Oak Park, Illinois, just west of Chicago. It is served by Metra's Union Pacific West Line, with service east to Ogilvie Transportation Center in Chicago and as far west as Elburn, Illinois. Travel time to Chicago is 16 to 20 minutes. , Oak Park is the 52nd busiest of the 236 non-downtown stations in the Metra system, with an average of 991 weekday boardings. It is the final stop for most UP West trains before the terminus at Ogilvie Transportation Center. Unless otherwise announced, inbound trains use the north (side) platform and outbound trains use the south (island) platform.

As of December 5, 2022, Oak Park is served by 56 trains (28 in each direction) on weekdays, by all 10 trains in each direction on Saturdays, and by all nine trains in each direction on Sundays and holidays.

The station is located along North Boulevard between Marion Street and Harlem Avenue, Oak Park's western border with River Forest and Forest Park. The Chicago Transit Authority's Green Line ends at Harlem/Lake and is connected directly to this station at Marion Street. Downtown Oak Park, which includes a large shopping district spread over both Oak Park and River Forest, is nearby with many stores centered on Harlem Avenue and Lake Street.

Amenities
A small convenience store is located on the main concourse.

The north platform, which services inbound trains, is sheltered and has assorted benches. The island platform to the south, which services outbound trains, has benches, though the access ramp from the concourse is sheltered and enclosed.

Bus and rail connections
CTA Green Line
Harlem/Lake

CTA
  90 Harlem 

Pace
  307 Harlem 
  309 Lake Street 
  313 St. Charles Road 
  318 West North Avenue 
  757 Oak Park/Schaumburg Limited (weekday rush hours only) 
  770 Brookfield Zoo Express/CTA Green Line (Memorial Day through Labor Day on weekends only)

References

External links

Metra - Oak Park
Marion Street entrance from Google Maps Street View
Forest Avenue entrance from Google Maps Street View

Metra stations in Illinois
Oak Park, Illinois
Railway stations in Cook County, Illinois
Former Chicago and North Western Railway stations
Railway stations in the United States opened in 1849
Union Pacific West Line